José Iván Rodríguez Rebollar (born 17 June 1996), also known as El Jefecito, is a Mexican professional footballer who plays as a defensive midfielder for Liga MX club León.

International career
Rodríguez was included in Gerardo Martino's preliminary roster for the 2019 CONCACAF Gold Cup but did not make the final list due to an ankle injury. He made his senior national team debut on 2 October 2019 in a friendly against Trinidad & Tobago. He started the game and played the whole match.

Career statistics

Club

International

Honours
León
Liga MX: Guardianes 2020
Leagues Cup: 2021

External links

References

Living people
1996 births
Sportspeople from Morelia
Footballers from Michoacán
Mexican footballers
Mexico international footballers
Club León footballers
Ocelotes UNACH footballers
Liga MX players
Liga Premier de México players
Tercera División de México players
Association football midfielders